The 2012 USA Indoor Track and Field Championships was held at Albuquerque Convention Center in Albuquerque, New Mexico. Organized by USA Track and Field (USATF), the two-day competition took place on February 25–26, in conjunction with the USA Indoor Combined Events Championships which started the week after, and served as the national championships in indoor track and field for the United States.

Medal summary

Men

Women

References

Results
2012 USA Indoor Track and Field Championships Results (archived). USA Track and Field. Retrieved on February 16, 2018.

External links
Official USATF website

2012
Track and field indoor
USA Indoor Track and Field Championships
Sports in Albuquerque, New Mexico
Sports competitions in New Mexico
2012 in sports in New Mexico
Track and field in New Mexico
Events in Albuquerque, New Mexico